Albert Bool (August 24, 1897 – September 27, 1981) was an American professional baseball player. He played in Major League Baseball as a catcher between 1928 and 1931 for the Washington Senators (1928), Pittsburgh Pirates (1930), and the Boston Braves (1931). After retiring from baseball he returned to the family farm near Lincoln where he farmed the rest of his life. He died at age 84 in a farming accident.

References

External links

Washington Senators (1901–1960) players
Pittsburgh Pirates players
Boston Braves players
Major League Baseball catchers
Syracuse Stars (minor league baseball) players
Quincy Red Birds players
Oakland Oaks (baseball) players
Baltimore Orioles (IL) players
Milwaukee Brewers (minor league) players
Little Rock Travelers players
Baseball players from Nebraska
Sportspeople from Lincoln, Nebraska
Road incident deaths in Nebraska
1897 births
1981 deaths